Raymond John Gough (8 February 1938 — 11 March 2018) was a Northern Irish football left half who played in the Football League for Millwall.

References

Association footballers from Northern Ireland
NIFL Premiership players
Association football wing halves
1938 births
2018 deaths
Association footballers from Belfast
Linfield F.C. players
English Football League players
Millwall F.C. players
Northern Ireland amateur international footballers
Crusaders F.C. players
Toronto Italia players
Weymouth F.C. players
Bath City F.C. players
Southern Football League players
Irish League representative players
Expatriate association footballers from Northern Ireland
Expatriate sportspeople from Northern Ireland in Canada
Expatriate soccer players in Canada
Canadian National Soccer League players